Gyolaysor (also ), former village in the Erivan uezd of the Erivan Governorate and during the Soviet period in the Artashat region of the Armenian SSR, located in Khosrov Forest. The village was founded in 1833 by Assyrian families emigrating from the Ottoman Empire. The village was abandoned 1949. At the end of 1960s, the village was officially suspended. Most of the inhabitants of the village have emigrated to Verin Dvin village.

Population

in 1831 there were 62 inhabitants in the village, all of them Muslims. In 1959, it was inhabited by 148 people consisting of Armenians, Assyrians and Azeris. In 1967, there were 15 houses with 80 Armenian population in the village.

References

Populated places in Ararat Province
Assyrian settlements
Assyrians in Armenia